The 2016 ARCA Racing Series presented by Menards was the 64th season of the ARCA Racing Series. The season began on February 13 with the Lucas Oil 200 driven by General Tire and ended on October 14 with the Kansas 150. Rookie Chase Briscoe, driving the No. 77 for Cunningham Motorsports, won the drivers' championship.

Tom Hessert III finished second behind Briscoe in the championship by 535 points. Matt Kurzejewski finished third in the championship.

Teams and drivers

Complete schedule

Limited schedule

Notes

Schedule 
The 2016 schedule was fully released on November 25, 2015.

Television coverage 
In the United States, ten races were broadcast by Fox Sports on FS1 or FS2. The eight races that were broadcast on FS1 include Daytona, Talladega, both Pocono events, Michigan, Indianapolis, Chicagoland, and Kansas, while Iowa and Kentucky were broadcast on FS2. Nine races were also aired on American Sports Network. The Toledo, Winchester, Berlin, Madison, and Illinois Fairgrounds races were broadcast live, while the Duquoin, Nashville, and both Salem races were shown on tape delay.

Results and standings

Races

Drivers' championship
(key) Bold – Pole position awarded by time. Italics – Pole position set by final practice results or rainout. * – Most laps led.

See also
 2016 NASCAR Sprint Cup Series
 2016 NASCAR Xfinity Series
 2016 NASCAR Camping World Truck Series
 2016 NASCAR K&N Pro Series East
 2016 NASCAR K&N Pro Series West
 2016 NASCAR Whelen Modified Tour
 2016 NASCAR Whelen Southern Modified Tour
 2016 NASCAR Pinty's Series
 2016 NASCAR Whelen Euro Series

References

External links 
 

ARCA Menards Series seasons
ARCA